Davallialactone is a bio-active hispidin analog isolated from fungi in the genus Inonotus.

References 

Hispidins